The Journal of Geometry and Physics is a scientific journal in mathematical physics. Its scope is to stimulate the interaction between geometry and physics by publishing primary research and review articles which are of common interest to practitioners in both fields. The journal is published by Elsevier since 1984.

The Journal covers the following areas of research:

Methods of:

 Algebraic and Differential Topology
 Algebraic Geometry
 Real and Complex Differential Geometry
 Riemannian and Finsler Manifolds
 Symplectic Geometry
 Global Analysis, Analysis on Manifolds
 Geometric Theory of Differential Equations
 Geometric Control Theory
 Lie Groups and Lie Algebras
 Supermanifolds and Supergroups
 Discrete Geometry
 Spinors and Twistors

Applications to:

 Strings and Superstrings
 Noncommutative Topology and Geometry
 Quantum Groups
 Geometric Methods in Statistics and Probability
 Geometry Approaches to Thermodynamics
 Classical and Quantum Dynamical Systems
 Classical and Quantum Integrable Systems
 Classical and Quantum Mechanics
 Classical and Quantum Field Theory
 General Relativity
 Quantum Information
 Quantum Gravity

Editors 
The editor-in-chief is G. Landi (Università di Trieste).
The Advisory Editor is U. Bruzzo.
The Editors are L. Jeffrey, V. Mathai and V. Rubtsov.

Impact factor 
According to the Journal Citation Reports, the journal has a 2021 impact factor of 1.249.

Abstracting and indexing 
This journal is indexed by the following services:
 Current Contents / Physics, Chemical, & Earth Sciences
 Web of Science
 Mathematical Reviews
 INSPEC
 Zentralblatt MATH
 Scopus

External links
 

Mathematics journals
Publications established in 1984
English-language journals
Elsevier academic journals